Dash Tappeh may refer to:
 Dash Tappeh, West Azerbaijan
 Dash Tappeh, Zanjan
 Dash Tappeh, Khodabandeh, Zanjan Province